NGC 345 is a spiral galaxy located in the constellation Cetus. It was discovered on September 27, 1864 by Albert Marth. It was described by Dreyer as "very faint, very small, gradually brighter middle."

References

External links
 

0345
18640927
Cetus (constellation)
Unbarred spiral galaxies
003665